Medius Kaharata Natukunda is a Ugandan politician and woman member of parliament. In 2021, she was elected as a woman representative in parliament for Rukungiri District during the 2021 Uganda general elections.

She is a member of the ruling National Resistance Movement political party.

See also 

 List of members of the eleventh Parliament of Uganda.
National Resistance Movement
Rukungiri District.
Parliament of Uganda.
Member of Parliament.

References

External links 

 Website of the Parliament of Uganda.

Members of the Parliament of Uganda
21st-century Ugandan women politicians
21st-century Ugandan politicians
Living people
National Resistance Movement politicians
Year of birth missing (living people)